Ashkanov Apollon (born 3 April 1991) is a professional footballer who plays as a winger or fullback for Hartford Athletic in the USL Championship. Born in the United States, he represents the Haiti national team.

Career
Ashkanov started playing soccer near the age of 17. Shortly after moving back to the United States, Apollon was recruited by Peninsula College, where he played one year under coach Andrew Chapman. That season, he scored 16 goals while leading the NWAACC in assists with 15, helping his team with a championship run in 2013.

In 2014, Apollon signed for Thailand AIS D2 side Looktabfah F.C. during the second half of their season, where he began his professional career. In 2015, he decided to return to the United States where he signed for PDL side Kitsap Pumas. In 2016, the forward joined the Seattle Sounder U-23 side for the short PDL season. After a year, he decided to move back to Thailand in July where he ended up signing for AIS D2 side Samut Sakhon FC. He helped them to the AIS Champions League and a place in the new Championship division in Thailand's 2017 league system. On 19 December 2016 Ashkanov Apollon signed a 1-year deal with Vietnam's V-League.1 side Long An FC.

In May 2021, Apollon joined National Independent Soccer Association side San Diego 1904 FC.

On 25 September 2021, Apollon joined USL Championship side Hartford Athletic.

International career
Born in the United States, Apollon is of Haitian descent through his parents. He debuted internationally with the Haitian national team in a 2–0 2022 FIFA World Cup qualification win over Belize on 25 March 2021.

References

External links
Ashkanov Apollon at Footballdatabase

1991 births
Living people
Haitian footballers
Haiti international footballers
American soccer players
American sportspeople of Haitian descent
American expatriate soccer players
Association football forwards
Kitsap Pumas players
Seattle Sounders FC U-23 players
Voltigeurs de Châteaubriant players
FC Mulhouse players
SR Colmar players
Hartford Athletic players
USL League Two players
V.League 1 players
Championnat National 3 players
American expatriate sportspeople in Thailand
American expatriate sportspeople in Vietnam
American expatriate sportspeople in France
Expatriate footballers in Thailand
Expatriate footballers in Vietnam
Expatriate footballers in France
Soccer players from Boston